The 1980 Australasian Individual Speedway Championship was the fifth annual Australasian Final for Motorcycle speedway riders from Australia and New Zealand as part of the qualification for the 1980 Speedway World Championship.

The Final was held at the Ruapuna Speedway in Templeton, located just outside Christchurch in New Zealand. Billy Sanders won his second consecutive Australasian Final from John Titman and Larry Ross. As reigning World Champion Ivan Mauger was seeded directly to the Commonwealth Final at the Wimbledon Stadium in London, England and was not required to ride in Templeton, only two other riders (Mitch Shirra and Phil Crump) moved forward into the Commonwealth Final.

Australasian final
2 February
 Templeton, New Zealand - Ruapuna Speedway
Qualification: First 5 plus 1 reserve to the Commonwealth Final in London, England
Reigning World Champion Ivan Mauger seeded directly to the Commonwealth Final

References

See also
 Sport in New Zealand
 Motorcycle Speedway

Speedway in New Zealand
1980 in speedway
Individual Speedway Championship